Edward Pritchard may refer to:

 Edward William Pritchard (1825–1865), Scottish doctor and murderer
 Edward Pritchard (engineer) (1930–2007), Australian steam car designer
 Edward Pritchard and Co. from Joseph W. Taylor
 Edward Pritchett, translator of the Telugu Bible, see Bible Society of India Andhra Pradesh Auxiliary
 Eddie Pritchard, boxer, opponent of Alan Richardson
 Ted Pritchard, boxer, opponent of Jim Hall

See also
 Edward Pritchard Gee (1904–1968), Anglo-Indian tea-planter and naturalist
 Edward Evans-Pritchard (1902–1973), British anthropologist